Sajid Khan may refer to:

Sajid Khan (born 1951), Indian actor
Sajid Khan (cricketer) (born 1993), Pakistani cricketer
Sajid Khan (director) (born 1970), Indian film director, TV presenter, comedian, actor
Sajid Khan (composer), one half of the Indian composing duo Sajid–Wajid
Sajid Ahmad Khan, Pakistani politician
Sajid Khan Mohmand, Pakistani politician, member of the National Assembly of Pakistan

See also 
Sajid (disambiguation)